CropSyst is a multi-year multi-crop daily time-step crop simulation model being developed by a team at Washington State University's Department of Biological Systems Engineering. The model is used to study the effect of cropping systems management on productivity (budgeting).

The model has been parameterised for a wide range of crops such as potatoes, lentils, tea and grapes. Management options include rotations, irrigation, fertilization and tillage. It is widely used within research projects around the world including the United States, Italy and the United Kingdom (e.g. Land Allocation Decision Support System).

See also

Agrometeorology
Biological engineering
Crop yield

External links
Cropsyst Official web site
Department of Biological Systems Engineering.

Resources
Peer reviewed papers and applications of CropSyst can be found at:
SIPEAA
LADSS-CropSyst

Agricultural economics

Agronomy
Crops
Washington State University